Film is an Iranian film review magazine published for more than 40 years. The president and chef-editor is Pooya Mehrabi with Massoud Mehrabi as editor.
Massoud Mehrabi is the founder of Film magazine, the oldest post-revolutionary film magazine in Iran (founded in 1982).

References

 Film Magazine Website / About

External links
 Official Website

1982 establishments in Iran
Film magazines published in Iran
Magazines established in 1982
Magazines published in Tehran
Persian-language magazines
Monthly magazines published in Iran